Henry Barthold Stelling Jr. (July 9, 1924 – September 20, 2021) was a United States Army major general who served as Vice Commander of the Electronic Systems Division, Air Force Systems Command from 1978 to 1980. He graduated from the United States Military Academy in 1948. Stelling died in Costa Mesa, California, on September 20, 2021, at the age of 97.

References

1924 births
2021 deaths
United States Air Force generals
People from South San Francisco, California
Military personnel from California